The Prandtl lifting-line theory is a mathematical model in aerodynamics that predicts lift distribution over a three-dimensional wing based on its geometry. It is also known as the Lanchester–Prandtl wing theory.

The theory was expressed independently by Frederick W. Lanchester in 1907, and by Ludwig Prandtl in 1918–1919 after working with Albert Betz and Max Munk.

In this model, the bound vortex loses strength along the whole wingspan because it is shed as a vortex-sheet from the trailing edge, rather than just as a single vortex from the wing-tips.

Introduction

It is difficult to predict analytically the overall amount of lift that a wing of given geometry will generate.
When analyzing a three-dimensional finite wing, the first approximation to understanding is to consider slicing the wing into cross-sections and analyzing each cross-section independently as a wing in a two-dimensional world. Each of these slices is called an airfoil, and it is easier to understand an airfoil than a complete three-dimensional wing.

One might expect that understanding the full wing simply involves adding up the independently calculated forces from each airfoil segment. However, it turns out that this approximation is grossly incorrect: on a real wing, the lift over each wing segment (local lift per unit span,  or ) does not correspond simply to what two-dimensional analysis predicts. In reality, the local amount of lift on each cross-section is not independent and is strongly affected by neighboring wing sections.

The lifting-line theory corrects some of the errors in the naive two-dimensional approach by including some of the interactions between the wing slices. It produces the lift distribution along the span-wise direction,  based on the wing geometry (span-wise distribution of chord, airfoil, and twist) and flow conditions.

Principle
The lifting-line theory applies the concept of circulation and the Kutta–Joukowski theorem,

 

so that instead of the lift distribution function, the unknown effectively becomes the distribution of circulation over the span, .

Modeling the local lift (unknown and sought-after) with the local circulation (also unknown) allows us to account for the influence of one section over its neighbors. In this view, any span-wise change in lift is equivalent to a span-wise change of circulation. According to Helmholtz's theorems, a vortex filament cannot begin or terminate in the air. Any span-wise change in lift can be modeled as the shedding of a vortex filament down the flow, behind the wing.

This shed vortex, whose strength is the derivative of the (unknown) local wing circulation distribution, influences the flow left and right of the wing section.

This sideways influence (upwash on the outboard, downwash on the inboard) is the key to the lifting-line theory. Now, if the change in lift distribution is known at given lift section, it is possible to predict how that section influences the lift over its neighbors: the vertical induced velocity (upwash or downwash) can be quantified using the velocity distribution within a vortex and related to a change in effective angle of attack over neighboring sections.

In mathematical terms, the local induced change of angle of attack  on a given section can be quantified with the integral sum of the downwash induced by every other wing section. In turn, the integral sum of the lift on each downwashed wing section is equal to the (known) total desired amount of lift.

The solution to this equation is a function  that accurately describes the circulation (and therefore lift) distribution over a finite wing of known geometry.

Derivation
(Based on.)

Nomenclature:
 is the circulation over the entire wing (m²/s)
 is the 3D lift coefficient (for the entire wing)
 is the aspect ratio
 is the freestream angle of attack (rad)
 is the freestream velocity (m/s)
 is the drag coefficient for induced drag
 is the planform efficiency factor

The following are all functions of the wings span-wise station  (i.e. they can all vary along the wing)
 is the 2D lift coefficient (units/m)
 is the 2D circulation at a section (m/s)
 is the chord length of the local section
 is the local change in angle of attack due to geometric twist of the wing
 is zero-lift angle of attack of that section (depends on the airfoil geometry)
 is the 2D lift coefficient slope (units/m⋅rad, and depends on airfoil geometry, see Thin airfoil theory)
 is change in angle of attack due to downwash
 is the local downwash velocity

To derive the model we start with the assumption that the circulation of the wing varies as a function of the spanwise locations. The function assumed is a Fourier function.

and so the circulation is assumed to be:

but since the coefficient of lift is a function of angle of attack:

 
hence the vortex strength at any particular spanwise station can be given by the equations:

However, the downwash is purely a function of the circulation only. The downwash at any given station is a function of the entire shed vortex system. This is determined by integrating the influence of each differential shed vortex over the span of the wing.

Differential element of circulation:

Differential downwash due to the differential element of circulation (acts like half an infinite vortex line):

The integral equation over the span of the wing to determine the downwash at a particular location is:

After appropriate substitutions and integrations we get:

And so the change in angle attack is determined by (assuming small angles):

By substituting equations 8 and 9 into RHS of equation 4 and equation 1 into the LHS of equation 4, we then get:

After rearranging, we get the series of simultaneous equations:

By taking a finite number of terms, equation 11 can be expressed in matrix form and solved for coefficients A. Note the left-hand side of the equation represents each element in the matrix, and the terms on the RHS of equation 11 represent the RHS of the matrix form. Each row in the matrix form represents a different span-wise station, and each column represents a different value for n.

Lift and drag from coefficients
The lift can be determined by integrating the circulation terms:

which can be reduced to:

where  is the first term of the solution of the simultaneous equations shown above.

The induced drag can be determined from

which can also be reduced to:

where  are all the terms of the solution of the simultaneous equations shown above.

 

where

 is the span efficiency factor

Symmetric wing
For a symmetric wing, the even terms of the series coefficients are identically equal to 0, and so can be dropped.

Rolling wings
When the aircraft is rolling, an additional term can be added that adds the wing station distance multiplied by the rate of roll to give additional angle of attack change. Equation 3 then becomes:

where 
 is the rate of roll in rad/sec,

Note that y can be negative, which introduces non-zero even coefficients in the equation that must be accounted for.

When the wing is rolling, the induced drag is altered because the lift vector is rotated at each spanwise station due to rolling rate. The resulting induced drag for a wing with a rolling rate is

where
 is the dimensionless rolling rate.

A similar change in induced drag is also present when the wing is flapping, and comprises the main production of thrust for flapping wings.

Control deflection
The effects of control surface deflection can be accounted for by simply changing the  term in Equation 3. For non-symmetric controls such as ailerons the  term changes on each side of the wing.

Elliptical wings
For an elliptical wing with no twist, with:

The chord length is given as a function of span location as:

Also,

This yields the famous equation for the elliptic induced drag coefficient:

where
 is the value of the wing span,
 is the position on the wing span, and
 is the chord.

Decomposed Fourier solution 
A decomposed Fourier series solution can be used to individually study the effects of planform, twist, control deflection, and rolling rate.

Useful approximations
A useful approximation is that

where
 is the 3D lift coefficient for elliptical circulation distribution,
 is the 2D lift coefficient slope (see thin airfoil theory),
 is the aspect ratio, and
 is the angle of attack in radians.

Note that this equation becomes the thin airfoil equation if AR goes to infinity.

As seen above, the lifting-line theory also states an equation for induced drag:

where
 is the induced drag component of the drag coefficient,
 is the 3D lift coefficient,
 is the aspect ratio,
 is the Oswald efficiency number (or span efficiency factor.) This is equal to 1 for elliptical circulation distribution, and usually tabulated for other distributions.

Interesting solutions 
According to lifting-line theory, any wing planform can be twisted to produce an elliptic lift distribution.

Limitations of the theory
The lifting line theory does not take into account the following:
 Compressible flow
 Viscous flow
 Swept wings
 Low aspect ratio wings
 Unsteady flows

See also
 Horseshoe vortex
 Kutta condition
 Thin airfoil theory
 Vortex lattice method

Notes

References
 L. J. Clancy (1975), Aerodynamics, Pitman Publishing Limited, London.  
 Abbott, Ira H., and Von Doenhoff, Albert E. (1959), Theory of Wing Sections, Dover Publications Inc., New York. Standard Book Number 486-60586-8

Aerodynamics